Ashok Kumar Singh is an Indian politician from Bharatiya Janata Party, Bihar and a four term Member of Bihar Legislative Assembly. And senior leader of BJP in Bihar. He has won elections, four times in a row from Paroo (Vidhan Sabha constituency).

Recently he was in news for getting phone calls threatening his life.

References 

Living people
Bihar MLAs 2020–2025
Bharatiya Janata Party politicians from Bihar
1967 births